Towns in Lithuania retain their historical distinctiveness even though for statistical purposes they are counted together with villages. At the time of the census in 2001, there were 103 cities, 244 towns, and some 21,000 villages in Lithuania. Since then three cities (Juodupė, Kulautuva, and Tyruliai) and two villages (Salakas and Jūrė) became towns. Therefore, during the 2011 census, there were 249 towns in Lithuania.

According to Lithuanian law, a town is a compactly-built settlement with a population of 500–3,000 and at least half of the population works in economic sectors other than agriculture. However, there are many exceptions as many cities, towns, and villages retain their statuses based on historical tradition. Towns usually have a church and are capitals of elderates. Some towns have a coat of arms.

Towns

See also
 List of cities in Lithuania (Lithuanian: plural – miestai, singular – miestas)
 List of Lithuanian towns in other languages
 Administrative divisions of Lithuania
 Counties (Lithuanian: singular – apskritis, plural – apskritys)
 Municipalities (Lithuanian: plural – savivaldybės, singular – savivaldybė)
 Elderships (or wards) (eldership, ward) (Lithuanian: plural – seniūnijos, singular – seniūnija).
 Seniūnaitija (sub-eldership)

References
In-line

General

 
 
 
 
 
 
 
 
 
 

 
Lithuania
Towns